Teaspiller was a web application launched in 2010 for accountants. In 2013 the company was acquired by Intuit, Inc as part of their TurboTax product line.  The Teaspiller employees and code were all acquired and the product has been relaunched as "TurboTax CPA select". 

It enables accountants to work remotely with clients (share files, send secure messages, schedule appointments), as well as find new clients looking for their specific skills through a complex search algorithm. This is done through extended profiles containing licensing information, professional histories, user ratings, peer endorsements, association memberships and practice areas. The service has been called an H&R Block killer by Business Insider and currently has 20,000 accountants listed. The application was built using the Django framework.

Company 
Teaspiller is built by Vemdara, LLC, a web company based in New York and founded in 2009 by Amit Vemuri (a former VP at Travelocity).

References

Further reading
 Fox Business:  Get a Little Help This Tax Season
 Killer Startups:  TeaSpiller.Com - Accountants for Hire
 Bloomberg Business Week:  Teaspiller Takes on TurboTax and H&R Block for Your Accounting Needs
 Entrepreneur:  Wednesday Web Resources: Four Great Free Tools That Work Great Together

External links
 Teaspiller

Companies based in New York (state)
Accounting software
Web applications
Tax software of the United States
Intuit software